The 1966 Wyoming Cowboys football team was an American football team that represented the University of Wyoming as a member of the Western Athletic Conference (WAC) during the 1966 NCAA University Division football season. In their fifth year under head coach Lloyd Eaton, the Cowboys compiled a 10–1 record, won the first of three consecutive WAC titles, outscored opponents by a total of 355 to 89, and had the nation's best rushing defense. 

The team played its home games on campus at War Memorial Stadium in Laramie.

Schedule

 The AP rankings included only the top ten this season; the final poll was released in late November.

NFL/AFL Draft
Four Cowboys were selected in the 1967 NFL/AFL Draft, the first common draft, which lasted seventeen rounds (445 selections).

List of Wyoming Cowboys in the NFL Draft

References

Wyoming
Wyoming Cowboys football seasons
Western Athletic Conference football champion seasons
Sun Bowl champion seasons
Wyoming Cowboys football